The Robert Award for Best Short Featurette was an award presented by the Danish Film Academy at the annual Robert Awards ceremony between 1987 and 2005 with several years where no award was given in the category.

Honorees

1980s 
 1987:  – 
 1988:  – 
 1989:  –

1990s 
 1990: Not awarded
 1991: Not awarded
 1992:  – Lasse Spang Olsen
 1993: Not awarded
 1994: Not awarded
 1995:  – 
 1996: Not awarded
 1997:  – 
 1998:  – 
 1999:  – Louise Andreasen

2000s 
 2000:  – 
 2001:  – Carsten Myllerup
 2002:  – Amir Rezazadeh
 2003:  – Pernille Fischer Christensen
 2004:  – 
 2005:  – Ulrik Wivel

References

External links 
  

1987 establishments in Denmark
Awards established in 1987
Featurettes
Featurette, short
Awards disestablished in 2006
2006 disestablishments in Denmark